Simon Gallaher (born 24 October 1958) is an Australian singer, actor, director and pianist.

Biography 
Gallaher was born in Brisbane and educated at the Anglican Church Grammar School. and studied at the Queensland Conservatorium of Music. Whilst studying, he joined the Queensland Light Opera Company. In 1977 he appeared on The Mike Walsh Show, he had his own television program, The Simon Gallaher Show on ABC-TV (1982–83), in which he sang and played the piano.

In 1979, Simon appeared again on The Mike Walsh Show, singing "Australia Be Proud" with the Marist Singer's of NSW, with Artistic Director, the late Paul Bateman OAM.

With his own musical theatre company Essgee Entertainment, Gallaher produced and acted in stage productions of The Pirates of Penzance, H.M.S. Pinafore, The Mikado, The Merry Widow and A Funny Thing Happened on the Way to the Forum, among others.

For most of the 1980s his song "Australia Be Proud" was heard at the conclusion of each broadcast day on television station CTC Canberra, accompanied by a montage of video clips from across Australia. He and Jackie Love had a hit record "My Friend" written by Neil Sedaka.

In 2014 Gallaher returned to the stage to be reunited with Jon English for the first time in many years as they performed in Spamalot for Harvest Rain Theatre Company at the Queensland Performing Arts Centre (QPAC). In 2015 he took over the role of The Wonderful Wizard of Oz in the Australian production of Wicked and opened with it at the commencement of the Brisbane season. Gallaher recently directed a new production of his version of The Pirates of Penzance, which played at the QPAC to celebrate the 30th Anniversary of the Arts Centre and of the show's original opening.

He retired as deputy chair on the board of trustees of QPAC in 2018 and has been reappointed to the board of the Queensland Theatre Company (QTC). In 2018 he was appointed to the board of the Queensland Symphony Orchestra. He was formerly the chair of Harvest Rain Theatre Company (2012–15). He is patron to many arts organisations, including The Queensland Show Choir, Queensland Youth Symphony Orchestra, Spotlight Theatre Company, Gold Coast Theatre Alliance and the Canberra Area Theatre Awards. He is a member of Live Performance Australia (LPA) and sits on the Helpmann Awards nominating panel for Musical Theatre.

Personal life 
Simon Gallaher married Lisa McKenney in 1990 and they have three children. She is the sister of Todd McKenney, with whom Gallaher had also had a relationship prior to marrying his sister. They lived in Tamborine Mountain and had a property at Palm Beach on the Gold Coast. They separated in April 2019.

Discography

Studio and live albums

Soundtrack and cast albums

Compilations albums

Singles

Awards and nominations

Logie Awards
The Logie Awards (officially the TV Week Logie Awards) is an annual gathering to celebrate Australian television, sponsored and organised by magazine TV Week, with the first ceremony in 1959, known then as the TV Week Awards, the awards are presented in 20 categories representing both public and industry voted awards.

|-
| Logie Awards of 1981
| Simon Gallagher - in The Mike Walsh Show (Nine Network)
| Logie Award for Most Popular New Talent
| 
|}

Mo Awards
The Australian Entertainment Mo Awards (commonly known informally as the Mo Awards), were annual Australian entertainment industry awards. They recognise achievements in live entertainment in Australia from 1975 to 2016. Pantano won 11 awards in that time.
 (wins only)
|-
| 1980
| himself 
| Encouragement Award
| 
|-
| 1981
| himself 
| Vocal/ Instrumental Act
| 
|-
| 1982
| himself 
| Vocal/ Instrumental Act
| 
|}

 Queenslander of the Year Commendation
 Advance Australia Award for his contributions to the arts
 Nominated for 2016 Helpmann award for Wicked (Best Male Actor in a Supporting Role in a Musical)

Selected theatrical bibliography 
 1984–86 The Pirates of Penzance (performing - Frederic)
 1985 Hello Dolly (performer)
 1987 The Student Prince (performer - Karl Franz)
 1988 My Fair Lady  (performer - Freddy Eynsford-Hill)
 1994 The Pirates of Penzance (creator of stage production, performing - Frederic) (the video of the stage production was accredited triple-platinum and the cast recording received an ARIA Award)
 1996 The Mikado  (creator of stage production) (also released on video)
 1997 HMS Pinafore  (creator of stage production) (also released on video)
 1998 A Funny Thing Happened on the Way to the Forum (Producer)
 1999 Master Class (Producer)
 1998/99 Merry Widow  (creator of stage production and performer - Camille)
 2001 The Pirates of Penzance (created revival production)
 2004 Eureka (producer in Association with Melbourne International Arts Festival)
 2008/09 The Mikado (producer)
 2012 Hairspray (performer)
 2014 Spamalot (performer)
 2015 Wicked (performer - Wizard) Brisbane and Perth
 2015 The Pirates of Penzance (director)

References

External links
 
 
 
 
 Simon Gallaher biography

1958 births
Living people
Australian male stage actors
Australian male television actors
Australian pianists
Logie Award winners
People educated at Anglican Church Grammar School
Male pianists
21st-century pianists
20th-century Australian male singers
21st-century Australian male singers